Happy Salma (born January 4, 1980) is an Indonesian actress, also known as producer of theatre performances and jewelry entrepreneur. She is one of the most influential figures in Asia, according to the Tatler Malaysia in 2020.

Career

Literature 
Happy Salma started her career in the entertainment industry as an actress in numerous sinetron (Indonesian soap operas). While pursuing her career in the entertainment industry, she realized her passion in Indonesian literature. She published two short stories books, namely Pulang (2006) which was nominated for Khatulistiwa Literary Award  and Telaga Fatamorgana (2008). Her short stories also featured in Titian: Anthology of Pupular Short Stories (2008), Lobakan: Short Story Anthology (2009), 24 Sauh Short Story Collaboration (2009) and Dari Murai ke Sangkar Emas (2009). In addition, Happy wrote a collaborative novel with Pidi Baiq entitled Hanya Salju dan Pisau Batu (2010). Lately, she wrote and published a creative biography of Desak Nyoman Suarti "The Warrior Daughter" (2015).

Theater 
Her passion in literature also led her to the theater or art performances. Her first debut on stage in 2007 as Nyai Ontosoroh in a performance entitled "Nyai Ontosoroh". In 2009, Happy played a monologue "Ronggeng Dukuh Paruk" in Amsterdam, Bern-Swiss, and Taman Ismail Marzuki, whose story was adapted from the novel Ronggeng Dukuh Paruk by Ahmad Tohari and then followed by another performance, namely "Jabang Tetuko" (2011), Java War "Opera Diponegoro" (2011), "Monolog Inggit" (2011-2014), "Roro Mendut" (2012), "#3Perempuanku, Bukan Bunga Bukan Lelaki" (2015), several theater performances with "Indonesia Kita"  and again played a role as Nyai Ontosoroh in "Bunga Penutup Abad" (2016-2017).

In line with her love and passion in art performances, Happy Salma founded a Titimangsa Fondation for arts and culture, which produced numerous major performances, such as Nyanyi Sunyi Revolusi  and Cinta Tak Pernah Sederhana in 2019.

Film 
Happy Salma has received many awards for acting, including: Best Supporting Actress at the 2008 Bandung Film Festival (Rinduku Cintamu), Best Supporting Actress at the 2010 Indonesian Film Festival (7 Hati 7 Cinta 7 Wanita), Best Supporting Actress and Favorite Supporting Actress at the 2011 Indonesian Movie Awards (7 Hati 7 Cinta 7 Wanita), Best Actress Award by Jakarta Art Institute in 2014, as well as Best Performance and Best Short Film in Plaza Indonesia Short Film Festival 2016 for short film "Ibu dan Anak Perempuannya".

Apart from being actress, Happy is a film director. She directed an omnibus film 'Rectoverso' along with Marcella Zalianty, Olga Lidya, Cathy Sharon, and Rachel Maryam. She directed a shot film "Kamis ke-300"  and "Ibu dan Anak Perempuannya".

In 2020, Happy directed a series entitled "Masakan Rumah" which were screened in Mola TV.

On February 12, 2022, actress Happy Salma attended the premiere of the competition film "Nana" (Before, Now & Then) directed by Kamila Andini at The 72nd Berlin International Film Festival. According to Hollywoodreporter, "...lead actor Happy Salma offer a precisely calibrated, emotionally nuanced exploration of one woman going through a mid-life crisis in rural Indonesia during the 1960s that both looks and sounds stunning thanks to above-and-beyond craft contributions."

"... Salma really has the most astonishingly beautiful face, enhanced with an immense range of expressive subtlety that’s reminiscent of Juliette Binoche, and the curvaceous figure of a young Sophia Loren, or Kim Kardashian if that’s your frame of reference. She also moves with an uncanny, slow grace, like she’s moving according to a frame rate from the silent era."

In 2022, Happy Salma won Best Female Lead at the 2022 Indonesian Movie Actors Awards (IMAA) for her role as Nana in the film Before, Now, and Then (Nana).  She also won Movie Actress of The Year by Film Pilihan Tempo 2022 for her role in the film Before, Now, and Then (Nana).

Tulola Jewelry 
Beside acting and literature, Happy also manage a jewelry business under the brand Tulola, which she founded with Sri Luce Rusna and Franka Makarim. Tulola has a very unique concept with design that explore Indonesian literature, culture, and nature. Happy has a role as Founder and Creative Conceptor. She adapt the initial inspiration to be created into jewelry design. For example, jewelry product that inspired by Indonesian music 'keroncong' is Juwita Malam Collection. In 2013, Tulola launched "Pitaloka" Collection that inspired by a tale of the Bubat War in 1367 and beautiful Sundanese princess Dyah Pitaloka Citraresmi. In 2015, Tulola launched "Women of Bumi Manusia" that inspired by a great Indonesian literature namely Bumi Manusia or This Earth of Mankind written by Pramoedya Ananta Toer. Then, Tulola launched many series of collection including "Lingkaran Semesta" (2016), "Truth" (2017), "Ubud" (2018), "Dewi Sri" (2018), "Perjalanan Kenangan" (2019), "Puspita" (2019) inspired by 5 character of Yogyakarta Princess (Putri Keraton Yogyakarta), "Nusantara" (2019) a collaboration with Indonesian actor Reza Rahadian, Indonesian singer Andien and Eva Celia, "Dengan Tanganku, Aku Merakit Mimpimu" (2019) inspired by a book entitled "Kuantar ke Gerbang" written by Ramadhan K.H., and "Jiwa Penuh Sinar" (2021).

Tulola now has several stores in Bali and Jakarta, including Seminyak, Kemang, Plaza Senayan, and Plaza Indonesia. For further information about Tulola Jewelry can be found at www.shoptulola.com

Personal life 
On October 3, 2010, Happy Salma married Tjokorda Bagus Dwi Santana Kertayasa, a man of noble descent from Ubud, Bali. They married in Puri Saren, Gianyar Regency, Bali.  The couple has two children: Tjokorda Sri Kinandari Kerthyasa (b. 2015) and Tjokorda Ngurah Rayidaru Kerthyasa (b. 2018).

Book 
 "Pulang" (2006)
 "Telaga Fatamorgana" (2008)
 "Hanya Salju dan Pisau Batu" (2010), a collaboration with Pidi Baiq
 "The Warrior Daughter" (2015), a creative biography of Desak Nyoman Suarti

Awards and nominations

References
 Footnotes

 Bibliography

External links

 

1980 births
Living people
21st-century Indonesian actresses
Actresses from West Java
People from Sukabumi
Sundanese people
Indonesian former Muslims
Converts to Hinduism
Converts to Hinduism from Islam
Indonesian actresses
Indonesian television actresses
Indonesian writers
Indonesian film directors
Indonesian women film directors
Indonesian female models
Indonesian Hindus
Trisakti University alumni